The girls' hockey 5s event at the 2018 African Youth Games in Algiers was held at the Stade Ferhani from 19 to 26 July 2018. The tournament served as a direct qualifier for the Youth Olympic Games, with the winner, runner-up and third placed team qualifying.

Qualified teams

Format
The six teams will be placed into one group. The top four teams advance to the semifinals to determine the winner in a knockout system. The bottom two teams play against each other for 5th and 6th place.

Results
''All times are local (UTC+1).

Preliminary round

Fifth and sixth place classification

First to fourth place classification

Semifinals

Third and fourth place

Final

Final standings

Goalscorers

References

Field hockey at the 2018 Summer Youth Olympics
2018 African Youth Games